Imeni Tairova is a neighbourhood in the Yerevan Province of Armenia.  The location is named after theatre director Alexander Tairov.

References 

Populated places in Yerevan